Javaris Cortez Crittenton (born December 31, 1987) is an American former professional basketball player. During his four year career, Crittenton played for the Los Angeles Lakers, Memphis Grizzlies, and Washington Wizards of the National Basketball Association (NBA), the Zhejiang Lions of the Chinese Basketball Association, and the Dakota Wizards of the NBA D-League. He was previously the starting point guard for the Georgia Tech men's basketball team.

On August 26, 2011, Crittenton was charged with the murder of Jullian Jones, a 22-year-old mother of four. After pleading guilty to manslaughter in 2015, he was sentenced to 23 years in prison.

Early life and high school
Crittenton was born to Sonya Dixon in Atlanta, Georgia. He attended Southwest Atlanta Christian Academy, where, as a high school sophomore, he played alongside Dwight Howard. Crittenton and Howard led Southwest Atlanta to victory in the GHSA class A state championship that season. As a junior, in 2005, Crittenton averaged 28.4 points, 7.5 assists, and 8.2 rebounds. He once again led Southwest Atlanta to the GHSA class A state finals, where they lost to powerhouse Randolph-Clay. As a senior, Crittenton averaged 29 points, 9 assists and 7 rebounds, and led Southwest Atlanta to the GHSA class A semi-finals against Randolph-Clay. After dismissing Randolph-Clay they headed to the championship game once again. This time they were successful in beating rivals Whitefield Academy to become state champions. Following the season he was named a McDonald's All American. He was also named Mr. Georgia Basketball by The Atlanta Journal-Constitution. Crittenton carried a 3.5 GPA in high school, and was a member of the Future Business Leaders of America and the Senior Beta Club.

College

While at Georgia Tech, Crittenton excelled and was considered a team leader, a rare accolade for a freshman. Tech coach Paul Hewitt urged Crittenton to take over a leadership role on the team after his play in several games in February 2007. He recorded a career high of 29 points in a February 13 game against Florida State.  After a single season, he left school to go pro.

Professional career

Los Angeles Lakers (2007–2008) 
Crittenton was drafted with the 19th pick in the first round of the 2007 NBA Draft by the Los Angeles Lakers. During an NBA Summer League game on July 8, 2007, he had 18 points, including a game winning jump-shot with 1.6 seconds left in the game. In the Lakers' first preseason game against the Golden State Warriors in Honolulu, Crittenton had 18 points along with one assist in a 111–110 loss.

Memphis Grizzlies (2008)
On February 1, 2008, Crittenton was traded to the Memphis Grizzlies along with Kwame Brown, Aaron McKie, rights to Marc Gasol and 2008 and 2010 first round draft picks for Pau Gasol and a 2010 second round draft pick. On April 2, 2008, Crittenton had a career high of 23 points in a 130–114 win over the New York Knicks.

Washington Wizards (2008–2009) 
On December 10, 2008, Crittenton was part of a three-team trade that sent him to the Washington Wizards along with Mike James from the New Orleans Hornets. In exchange, the Wizards sent a conditional first-round draft pick to the Memphis Grizzlies and Antonio Daniels to the Hornets.

In December 2009, Crittenton and teammate Gilbert Arenas were involved in a locker room confrontation involving guns. In a recent interview, former Washington Wizards teammate Caron Butler stated that "you never know, and that's the crazy thing about it" when questioned if there was going to be a trigger pulled in the incident between Crittenton and Arenas.  On January 25, 2010 Crittenton pleaded guilty and was given a year of probation on a misdemeanor gun possession charge stemming from this incident. Two days later, Crittenton and Arenas were suspended for the rest of the season by NBA commissioner David Stern.  He was released by the Wizards following the suspension, while Arenas rejoined the team.

Zhejiang Guangsha Lions (2010) 
On September 22, 2010, the Charlotte Bobcats signed Crittenton to a non-guaranteed contract. They released him three weeks later on October 15.

In December 2010, Crittenton played five games for the Zhejiang Guangsha Lions of the Chinese Basketball Association.  He averaged 25.8 points per game, but he returned to the United States after just a few weeks.

Dakota Wizards (2011)
In February 2011, Crittenton joined the Dakota Wizards of the NBA D-League. He played 21 games for the minor league team, including five starts.

Murder and drug charges

On August 26, 2011, Crittenton was charged with the August 19 murder of Jullian Jones, a 22-year-old mother of four. Atlanta Police Department indicated that Jones was not the intended target; they  believed that Crittenton was targeting a person who robbed him in April 2011.  Jones was shot in the leg and died during surgery. Crittenton was arrested by the FBI in John Wayne Airport in Orange County, California, on August 29, while waiting to board a flight back to Atlanta.  His lawyer stated that Crittenton's sole purpose for the trip to Atlanta was to surrender himself to custody.  Crittenton was extradited to Atlanta to stand trial for the murder.  After his arrest, he denied any involvement.  Crittenton was released on a $230,000 bond.

Crittenton and his cousin Douglas Gamble were officially indicted on April 2, 2013, on 12 counts in connection with Jones' death, including charges of murder, felony murder, aggravated assault with a deadly weapon, possession of a firearm during the commission of a felony, giving false statements, attempted murder, and participation in criminal street gang activity. Crittenton reportedly joined the Crips after signing with the Los Angeles Lakers, according to Fulton County assistant district attorney Gabe Banks, and allegedly also shot at Demontinez Stephens earlier in August 2011. The target in both shootings was reportedly Trontavious Stephens, Demontinez's brother and a member of the R. O. C. Crew, which is part of the Bloods.

While out on bond on the murder charges, Crittenton was arrested pursuant to a January 10, 2014, indictment of him and 13 other persons who were accused of selling multi-kilo quantities of cocaine and several hundred pounds of marijuana. Crittenton was charged with two counts of conspiracy to violate the Georgia Controlled Substance Act.

On April 29, 2015, shortly before his trial was set to begin, Crittenton pleaded guilty to voluntary manslaughter with a weapon and aggravated assault with a firearm. He was sentenced to 23 years in prison. He is currently incarcerated at Calhoun State Prison in Morgan, Georgia.

NBA career statistics

Regular season 
 

|-
| style="text-align:left;"| 
| style="text-align:left;"| L.A. Lakers
| 22|| 0 || 7.8 || .491 || .333 || .679 || 1 || .8 || .3 || 0 || 3.3
|-
| style="text-align:left;"| 
| style="text-align:left;"| Memphis
| 28 || 0 || 18.1 || .400 || .265 || .697 || 3.2 || 1.2 || 0.1 || 0.4 || 7.4
|-
| style="text-align:left;"| 
| style="text-align:left;"| Memphis
| 7 || 0 || 6.3 || .460 || .000 || .455 || 0.9 || 0.7 || .000 || 0.1 || 2.7
|-
| style="text-align:left;"| 
| style="text-align:left;"| Washington
| 56 || 10 || 20.2 || .459 || .143 || .593 || 2.9 || 2.6 || 0.1 || 0.7 || 5.3
|-
|- class="sortbottom"
| style="text-align:center;" colspan="2"| Career
| 113 || 10 || 16.4 || .442 || .231 || .638 || 2.4 || 1.8 || .5 || .1 || 5.3

See also
 2006 high school boys basketball All-Americans
 2006-07 Georgia Tech Yellow Jackets men's basketball team

References

External links

 
 
 Georgia Tech Yellow Jackets bio 

1987 births
Living people
21st-century American criminals
American expatriate basketball people in China
American male criminals
American men's basketball players
American people convicted of manslaughter
American sportspeople convicted of crimes
Basketball players from Atlanta
Dakota Wizards players
Georgia Tech Yellow Jackets men's basketball players
Los Angeles Lakers draft picks
Los Angeles Lakers players
McDonald's High School All-Americans
Memphis Grizzlies players
Parade High School All-Americans (boys' basketball)
People extradited within the United States
Point guards
Prisoners and detainees of Georgia (U.S. state)
Washington Wizards players
Zhejiang Lions players